Banaz is a town and district of Uşak Province, Turkey.

Banaz may also refer to:

 Banaz, Bolu, a village in the district of Bolu, Bolu Province, Turkey
 Banaz, Mengen, a village in the district of Mengen, Bolu Province, Turkey
 Banaz a Love Story, a 2012 documentary film